Suresh Dhas is a member of the Maharashtra Legislative Council. Suresh Dhas is 3 time former member of Maharashtra legislative assembly from Ashti constituency (1999 to 2014) who served as minister of state for revenue, rehabilitation in Maharashtra government. His nickname Anna is famous in public. He was a member of the Nationalist Congress Party before switching to the Bharatiya Janata Party. He won his seat on 11 June 2018 with 526 votes while Ashok Jagdale, the candidate backed by the Nationalist Congress Party, earned 452 votes. Earlier, Ramesh Karad had filed a nomination from the NCP but had withdrawn on the last day, forcing NCP and Congress to support an independent member. He is called Anna by his supporters. He has a son named Jaydatta Dhas and Sagar Dhas.

References 

Date of birth missing (living people)
Living people
Bharatiya Janata Party politicians from Maharashtra
Nationalist Congress Party politicians from Maharashtra
Year of birth missing (living people)
Members of the Maharashtra Legislative Council
Nationalist Congress Party politicians